The Cavour III government was the 13th and last cabinet of the Kingdom of Sardinia. It held office from 21 January 1860 until 23 March.

Composition

References

Italian governments
1860 establishments in Italy
1861 disestablishments in Italy